Springfield is a town in Orangeburg County, South Carolina, United States. The population was 524 at the 2010 census.

History
The Springfield High School was added to the National Register of Historic Places in 2001.

Geography
Springfield is located at  (33.495818, -81.279294).

According to the United States Census Bureau, the town has a total area of 1.6 square miles (4.0 km2), all land.

Demographics

As of the census of 2000, there were 504 people, 228 households, and 152 families residing in the town. The population density was 322.8 people per square mile (124.7/km2). There were 263 housing units at an average density of 168.4 per square mile (65.1/km2). The racial makeup of the town was 69.84% White, 29.37% African American, 0.60% Native American and 0.20% Asian. Hispanic or Latino of any race were 0.79% of the population.

There were 228 households, out of which 22.8% had children under the age of 18 living with them, 46.1% were married couples living together, 18.0% had a female householder with no husband present, and 33.3% were non-families. 31.6% of all households were made up of individuals, and 20.2% had someone living alone who was 65 years of age or older. The average household size was 2.21 and the average family size was 2.74.

In the town, the population was spread out, with 20.2% under the age of 18, 7.3% from 18 to 24, 22.4% from 25 to 44, 26.8% from 45 to 64, and 23.2% who were 65 years of age or older. The median age was 45 years. For every 100 females, there were 83.9 males. For every 100 females age 18 and over, there were 74.8 males.

The median income for a household in the town was $31,563, and the median income for a family was $40,833. Males had a median income of $35,833 versus $21,364 for females. The per capita income for the town was $19,285. About 4.0% of families and 5.8% of the population were below the poverty line, including 0.9% of those under age 18 and 12.7% of those age 65 or over.

Education
Springfield has a public library, a branch of the Orangeburg County Library.

Arts and culture
The town has also hosted the SC Governor's Frog Jump since 1969.

There is also a livestock auction and flea market, venues that are unique for the area.

References

External links
Information about Springfield from Orangeburg County

Towns in Orangeburg County, South Carolina
Towns in South Carolina